Jenny Larson is an American film, theater and voice actress who primarily does voice work for ADV Films. She is most well known for her roles as Sakura in the Sakura Wars and Potamos in Wedding Peach.

Filmography

Live-action
Gretchen - Charlene
The Man From Orlando - Girl #1 in Bar

Anime roles
009-1 - Mysterious Woman, Golden Cyborg
Comic Party Revolution - Subaru MikageComic Party Revolution (OVA) - Subaru Mikage
Cosplay Complex - Reika
Dai-Guard - Yokozawa's Sister, additional voices
Get Backers - Riko Tachibana
Moeyo Ken - Yuko Kondo
Moeyo Ken (OVA) - Yuko Kondo
Petite Princess Yucie - Frere
Sakura Wars (TV series) - Sakura Shinguji
Sonic Soldier Borgman Last Battle - Anice Farm
Sonic Soldier Borgman Lover's Rain - Anice Farm
Wedding Peach - Potamos/Hiromi Kawanami
Wedding Peach DX - Potamos/Hiromi Kawanami

References

Living people
Year of birth missing (living people)